Swetha Changappa is a Kannada television actress who has acted in various tele-serials and films. She is well known for her role "Rani" in Majaa Talkies.

Career
She debuted her acting career through Sumathi, a serial directed by S. Narayan, aired on Udaya TV during 2003-2005. Her fame was her among the television audience of Karnataka reached heights through her role in Kannada soap Kadambari which was produced by Balaji Telefilms and aired on Udaya TV in 2006. She acted in lead roles for Sukanya and Arundhathi that were aired on ETV Kannada (now Colors Kannada )which eventually became bigger hits in 2008 and 2010 respectively. She also hosted TV show Yaariguntu Yaarigilla on Zee Kannada which was themed on celebration of spirit of womanhood. She also hosted Kuniyonu Baara on Zee Kannada, which was a dance show for children. She also hosted Dance Dance Juniors on Star Suvarna which was a dance show for children.
Shwetha has also acted in Kannada movies, Thangigagi with Darshan Thoogudeep and Varsha with Vishnuvardhan. Shwetha was a contestant of Bigg Boss Kannada Season 2, which was hosted by Kiccha Sudeep when she emerged in fourth-place. She participated in Super Minute aired on ETV Kannada hosted by Ganesh in the grand finale episode  along with Nikita Thukral, Deepika Kamaiah, Neethu, Anushree, Kayva, Anumapa and Narendra Babu Sharma. She is currently acting as Rani in the Kannada sketch comedy show ''Majaa Talkies with Srujan Lokesh.

Awards
Shwetha has won Best Anchor Award by Zee Kannada in Kutumba awards twice. She has also won the Best Actress Award in Madhyamsanman 2013 by Karnataka Government for her role in Arundhathi.

Filmography

Films

Television

References

Living people
Actresses from Bangalore
Indian television actresses
Indian film actresses
People from Kodagu district
Actresses in Kannada cinema
Actresses in Kannada television
21st-century Indian actresses
1985 births